Sommar (Swedish for summer) may refer to:

 Sommar (radio program)
 Hej hej sommar, a Swedish television program
 Idas sommarvisa (also known as )
 Sommar i Sverige, a song by Sven-Ingvars
 Sommar och syndare, a 1960 film
 One Summer of Happiness, original title 
 Sune's Summer, original title 
 Ingen sommar utan reggae, a song by Markoolio
 Midsommar (film), a 2019 horror film